Aidoneus was a mythical king of the Molossians in Epirus, who is represented as the husband of Persephone.  After Theseus, with the assistance of Pirithous, concealed Helen at Aphidnae, he went to Epirus to procure for Pirithous Kore, the wife of Aidoneus, as a reward.  When Aidoneus discovered that they had come with the intention of carrying off his wife, he had Pirithous killed by Cerberus, and kept Theseus in captivity, who was afterwards released at the request of Heracles.  Eusebius calls the wife of Aidoneus a daughter of queen Demeter, with whom he had eloped.  Thus, the story of Aidoneus is the legend of Hades' kidnapping of Persephone, with the mythical king substituted for the God Hades. It has been written that this adaptation of the myth is "undoubtedly the work of a late interpreter" of ancient myths. It is also notable that Aidoneus is a lengthened form of the Greek for Hades that infrequently appears in original sources, including Homer (Iliad v, 190; xx, 61.)

Notes

References 

 Plutarch, Lives with an English Translation by Bernadotte Perrin. Cambridge, MA. Harvard University Press. London. William Heinemann Ltd. 1914. 1. Online version at the Perseus Digital Library. Greek text available from the same website.

Kings in Greek mythology
Epithets of Hades

Epirotic mythology